The George and Bertha Graff House is a historic house in Santa Clara, Utah. It was built with adobe in 1908 by George A. Graff, a farmer of Swiss descent. It has been listed on the National Register of Historic Places since December 4, 1998.

References

Adobe buildings and structures	
National Register of Historic Places in Washington County, Utah
Georgian architecture in Utah
Houses completed in 1908
1908 establishments in Utah